Richard Stubbe (died 1619), of Sedgeford, Norfolk, was an English politician.

He was a Member (MP) of the Parliament of England for Castle Rising in 1589.

References

16th-century births
1619 deaths
English MPs 1589
People from King's Lynn and West Norfolk (district)